Amos Niven Wilder (September 18, 1895 – May 4, 1993) was an American poet, minister, and theology professor.

Life
Wilder was born in Madison, Wisconsin.  He studied for two years at Oberlin College (1913–1915), but volunteered in the Ambulance Field Service; he was awarded the Croix de Guerre.  In November 1917, he enlisted in the U.S. Field Artillery as a corporal. He wrote Battle Retrospect, about his experiences in World War I.

In 1920, Wilder graduated from Yale University. In college he was an inter-collegiate doubles champion tennis player, and he played at Wimbledon in 1922, with his partner Lee Wiley.  He served as secretary to Albert Schweitzer lecturing at Oxford University, where he was studying at Mansfield College (1921–1923). He completed his studies for ordained ministry at Yale in 1924.

Ministry
Wilder was ordained in 1926 and served in a Congregational church in North Conway, New Hampshire. He received his doctorate from Yale in 1933. He taught for 11 years at the Chicago Theological Seminary and the University of Chicago, and served as president of the Chicago Society of Biblical Research in 1949–1950. Wilder joined Harvard University in 1954 as Hollis Professor of Divinity. In 1962 he was part of the first board of directors for the Society for the Arts, Religion and Contemporary Culture. In 1963, he was named emeritus faculty.  His papers are held at the Harvard Divinity School Library of Harvard Divinity School.

Family
Wilder's father, Amos Parker Wilder, was a journalist with a doctorate from Yale, who served as United States Consul General in Hong Kong and Shanghai between 1906 and 1914. His mother was the daughter of a Presbyterian minister.  His brother was Thornton Wilder, and sisters were Charlotte Wilder, Isabel Wilder and Janet Wilder Dakin.

Wilder married Catharine Kerlin in 1935. They had a daughter, Catharine Wilder Guiles, and a son, Amos Tappan Wilder.

Awards
 Golden Rose Award
 1923 Yale Series of Younger Poets, Battle Retrospect

Works

Poetry

 
  reprint 1971 by AMS Press.

Memoir

Theology

Non-fiction

Criticism

See also
List of ambulance drivers during World War I
Theopoetics

References

External links
 Papers of Wilder are in the Harvard Divinity School Library at Harvard Divinity School in Cambridge, Massachusetts

1895 births
1993 deaths
Alumni of Mansfield College, Oxford
American expatriates in the United Kingdom
American male tennis players
United States Army personnel of World War I
American theologians
American World War I poets
20th-century American male writers
American male poets
Harvard Divinity School faculty
Oberlin College alumni
Sportspeople from Madison, Wisconsin
People from North Conway, New Hampshire
Recipients of the Croix de Guerre 1914–1918 (France)
Tennis people from Wisconsin
University of Chicago faculty
Writers from Wisconsin
Yale Bulldogs men's tennis players
Yale Younger Poets winners
United States Army soldiers
American Congregationalists